Papilio nobilis, the noble swallowtail, is a butterfly of the family Papilionidae. It is found in Africa.

The larvae feed on Warburgia ugandensis.

Taxonomy
Papilio nobilis is a member of the oribazus species group. The clade members are:
Papilio oribazus Boisduval, 1836
Papilio epiphorbas Boisduval, 1833
Papilio nobilis Rogenhofer, 1891

Subspecies
Papilio nobilis nobilis (highlands of Kenya, Lake Victoria, eastern Uganda, north-western Tanzania)
Papilio nobilis didingensis Carpenter, 1928  (southern Sudan)
Papilio nobilis crippsianus Stoneham, 1936 . (Congo Republic, western Uganda, western Kenya, north-western Tanzania)
Papilio nobilis mpanda Kielland, 1990 (western Tanzania)

References

External links

Butterflies described in 1891
nobilis
Butterflies of Africa
Taxa named by Alois Friedrich Rogenhofer